Sławęcin  is a village in the administrative district of Gmina Kamieniec Ząbkowicki, within Ząbkowice Śląskie County, Lower Silesian Voivodeship, in south-western Poland.

Throughout history the village formed part of Poland, Bohemia, Hungary, Austria, Prussia and Germany. Following Nazi Germany's defeat in World War II, the village became again part of Poland. In 1975–1998, Sławęcin formed part of the Wałbrzych Voivodeship of Poland.

References

Villages in Ząbkowice Śląskie County